The following list is a discography of production by Pheelz, a Nigeria record producer from Lagos State.

Singles
"Durosoke" – Olamide (2012)
"First of All" – Olamide (2012)
"Hustle" - Pheelz (2012)
"Rayban Abacha" - Olamide (2013)
"Popular" (feat. Pheelz) - Vector (2013)
"Eleda Mi O" – Olamide (2014)
"Dope Money" – Olamide (2014)
"Shoki" – Lil Kesh (2015)
"P-Popping" - Viktoh (2018)
"Follow Me" - Guccimaneko (feat. Olamide) (2018)
"Onyeoma" - Phyno (feat. Olamide) (2018)
"Owo Shayo" - Olamide (2018)
"Gobe" (with. Naira Marley, and Olamide ) - Pheelz (2019)
"Spirit" - Olamide (2019)
"Crown Of Clay" (feat. Pheelz) - M.I, and Vector (2021)
"Raise Your Hand" (feat. Teni) - Reekado Banks (2021)
"Stand Strong" (feat. Sunday Service Choir) - Davido (2022)

Studio Albums

EPs

References

Discographies of Nigerian artists
Albums produced by Pheelz